Nasir al-Dawla Abu Muhammad al-Husayn ibn Hamdan was a descendant of the Hamdanid dynasty who became a general of the Fatimid Caliphate, ruing Egypt as a de facto dictator in 1071–1073.

Abu Muhammad al-Husayn was a grandson of Abu Abdallah al-Husayn ibn Nasir al-Dawla, a Hamdanid prince who had fled to the Fatimid Caliphate when Mosul had been taken over by the Uqaylid dynasty in 990. He served as governor of Damascus from 1041 to 1048, succeeding Anushtakin al-Dizbari. 

He played a leading role in the civil war of 1067 to 1073 between the Fatimids' Turkish and Nubian troops as the leader of the former. In this struggle, he requested the assistance of the Seljuks and even tried to abolish the Fatimid caliph al-Mustansir and restore allegiance to the Abbasids. He succeeded in becoming master of Cairo and reduced al-Mustansir to a powerless puppet, while his Turks plundered the palace and the treasury. His increasingly tyrannical regime led to a split and he was ousted for a time, but was able to regain control of Cairo in 1071/2. His rule was ended with the murder of himself and his family in March/April 1073. The anarchic conditions in the country continued until al-Mustansir called upon the governor of Palestine, Badr al-Jamali, for aid in late 1073.

References

Sources
 
 
 
 

1073 deaths
Year of birth unknown
Generals of the Fatimid Caliphate
Hamdanid dynasty
Rebellions against the Fatimid Caliphate
Assassinated military personnel
Fatimid governors of Damascus
11th-century people from the Fatimid Caliphate
11th-century Arabs